Israel is home to about 1100 described species of bees. A partial list is given below, with around 850 species as of 2014. Bee taxonomy and nomenclature are in accordance with the Discover Life website.

Indigenous species

Colletidae

Colletes acutiformis Noskiewicz, 1936
Colletes albomaculatus  (Lucas, 1849) 
Colletes alfkeni Noskiewicz, 1958
Colletes bytinskii Noskiewicz, 1955   קולט ביטינסקי
Colletes cariniger  Pérez, 1903
Colletes elegans Noskiewicz, 1936
Colletes formosus  Pérez, 1895
Colletes fuscicornis  Noskiewicz, 1936
Colletes judaicus Noskiewicz, 1955 קולט יהודה
Colletes lacunatus  Dours, 1872
Colletes maidli  Dours, 1872
Colletes nanus Friese, 1898
Colletes perezi Morice, 1904
Colletes pseudojejunus  Noskiewicz, 1959
Colletes pumilus Morice, 1904
Colletes punctatus  Mocsáry, 1877
Colletes rozeni  Kuhlmann, 2005
Colletes similis Schenck, 1853
Colletes squamulosus Noskiewicz, 1936   קולט קשקשי
Colletes tuberculatus  Morawitz, 1894
Hylaeus adspersus (Alfken, 1935)
Hylaeus albonotatus (Walker, 1871)
Hylaeus alexandrinus (Warncke, 1992)
Hylaeus armeniacus (Warncke, 1981)
Hylaeus bifasciatus (Jurine, 1807)
Hylaeus brevicornis Nylander, 1852 מסוונית קצרת-מחוש
Hylaeus clypearis (Schenck, 1853)
Hylaeus cornutus Curtis, 1831
Hylaeus crispulus Dathe, 1980
Hylaeus dinkleri (Friese, 1898)
Hylaeus fossifer Dathe, 1995
Hylaeus gibbus Saunders, 1850
Hylaeus gujaraticus (Nurse, 1903)
Hylaeus hermonus (Warncke, 1981)
Hylaeus imparilis Forster, 1871
Hylaeus kahri Forster, 1871
Hylaeus kotschisus (Warncke, 1981)
Hylaeus laevithorax (Alfken, 1924)
Hylaeus lineolatus (Schenck, 1861)
Hylaeus longimaculus (Alfken, 1936)
Hylaeus maculatus (Alfken, 1904)
Hylaeus moricei (Friese, 1898)
Hylaeus nigrifacies Bramson, 1879 מסוונית האגמון
Hylaeus orientalicus (Warncke, 1981)
Hylaeus pictipes Nylander, 1852
Hylaeus pictus (Smith, 1853)
Hylaeus punctatus (Brulle, 1832)
Hylaeus punctulatissimus Smith, 1842
Hylaeus punctus Förster, 1871
Hylaeus rubicola Saunders, 1850
Hylaeus rugicollis Morawitz, 1873
Hylaeus scutellatus (Spinola, 1838)
Hylaeus sidensis (Warncke, 1981)
Hylaeus signatus (Panzer, 1798)
Hylaeus sinuatus (Schenck, 1853)
Hylaeus soror (Pérez, 1903)
Hylaeus syriacus (Alfken, 1936)
Hylaeus taeniolatus Forster, 1871
Hylaeus trifidus (Alfken, 1936)
Hylaeus tyrolensis Forster, 1871
Hylaeus variegatus (Fabricius, 1798)
Hylaeus xanthopoda (Vachal, 1895) מסוונית צהובת-רגל

Andrenidae

Andrena abbreviata Dours, 1873
Andrena aegyptiaca Friese, 1899
Andrena aegypticola Friese, 1922
Andrena aeneiventris Morawitz, 1872
Andrena aerinifrons Dours, 1873
Andrena albifacies Alfken, 1927
Andrena albopunctata (Rossi, 1792)
Andrena alfkenelloides Warncke, 1965
Andrena anatolica Alfken, 1935
Andrena arsinoe Schmiedeknecht, 1900
Andrena aruana Warncke, 1967
Andrena astica Warncke, 1967  
Andrena avara Warncke, 1967
Andrena bassana Warncke, 1969
Andrena bimaculata (Kirby, 1802)
Andrena biskrensis Pérez, 1895
Andrena bisulcata Morawitz, 1877
Andrena bonasia Warncke, 1969
Andrena brumanensis Friese, 1899
Andrena butea Warncke, 1965
Andrena bytinskii Warncke, 1969
Andrena caroli Pérez, 1895
Andrena caspica Morawitz, 1886
Andrena chaetogastra Pittioni, 1950
Andrena cinereophila Warncke, 1965
Andrena colletiformis Morawitz, 1874
Andrena combaella Warncke, 1966
Andrena combusta Morawitz, 1876
Andrena crassana Warncke, 1965
Andrena crocusella Pisanty & Scheuchl 2016
Andrena cubiceps Friese, 1914
Andrena curiosa (Morawitz, 1877)
Andrena cyanomicans Pérez, 1895
Andrena cypria Pittioni, 1950
Andrena danini Pisanty & Scheuchl 2016
Andrena dauma Warncke, 1969
Andrena dorsata (Kirby, 1802)
Andrena elisaria Gusenleitner, 1998
Andrena elmaria Gusenleitner, 1998
Andrena eremobia Guiglia, 1833
Andrena euzona Pérez, 1895
Andrena exquisita Warncke, 1975
Andrena falcinella Warncke, 1969
Andrena fimbriatoides Scheuchl, 2004
Andrena flavipes Panzer, 1799 אנדרנה צהובת-רגל 
Andrena forsterella Osytshnjuk, 1978
 Andrena freidbergi Pisanty &  Scheuchl, 2018
Andrena fuligula Warncke, 1965
Andrena fulvitarsis Brulle, 1832
Andrena fuscocalcarata Morawitz, 1877
Andrena fuscosa Erichson, 1835
Andrena galilaea Pisanty & Scheuchl, 2018
Andrena garrula Warncke, 1965
Andrena gazella Friese, 1922
Andrena glareola Warncke, 1969
Andrena gordia Warncke, 1975
Andrena govinda Warncke, 1974
Andrena guttata Warncke, 1969
Andrena helouanensis Friese, 1899
Andrena henotica Warncke, 1975
Andrena hermonella Scheuchl & Pisanty 2016
Andrena hesperia Smith, 1853
Andrena hierosolymitana Pisanty & Scheuchl, 2018
Andrena humabilis Warncke, 1965
Andrena hyacinthina Mavromoustakis, 1958
Andrena hyemala Warncke, 1973
Andrena iliaca Warncke, 1969
Andrena impasta Warncke, 1975
Andrena impunctata Pérez, 1895
Andrena innesi Gribodo, 1894
Andrena isabellina Warncke, 1969
Andrena isis Schmiedeknecht, 1900
Andrena israelica Scheuchl & Pisanty 2016
Andrena judaea Scheuchl & Pisanty 2016
Andrena kilikiae Warncke, 1969
Andrena krausiella Gusenleitner, 1998
Andrena labialis (Kirby, 1802)
Andrena langadensis Warncke, 1965
Andrena lateralis Morawitz, 1876
Andrena lepida Schenck, 1861
Andrena leucura Warncke, 1974
Andrena limata Smith, 1853
Andrena lindbergella Pittioni, 1950
Andrena longibarbis Pérez, 1895
Andrena luscinia Warncke, 1975
Andrena magunta Warncke, 1965
Andrena mariana Warncke, 1968
Andrena mehelyi Alfken, 1936
Andrena melittoides Friese, 1899
Andrena menahemella Scheuchl & Pisanty 2016
Andrena merula Warncke, 1969
Andrena microcardia Pérez, 1895
Andrena monilia Warncke, 1967
Andrena moricei Friese, 1899
Andrena morio Brulle, 1832  אנדרנה שחורה 
Andrena mucida Kriechbaumer 1873
Andrena mucronata Morawitz, 1871
Andrena negevana Gusenleitner & Scheuchl, 2000
Andrena nigroaenea (Kirby, 1802)
Andrena nisoria Warncke, 1969
Andrena nitidiuscula Schenck, 1853
Andrena nubica Warncke, 1975
Andrena oedicnema Warncke, 1975
Andrena orientana Warncke, 1965
Andrena ovatula (Kirby, 1802)
Andrena paganettina Warncke, 1965
Andrena palaestina Pisanty & Scheuchl 2016
Andrena pallidicincta Brulle, 1832
Andrena pandosa Warncke, 1968
Andrena panurgimorpha Mavromoustakis, 1957
Andrena paradoxa Friese, 1921
Andrena paramythensis Mavromoustakis, 1957
Andrena paucisquama Noskiewicz, 1924
Andrena perahia Pisanty & Scheuchl 2016
Andrena pesleria Gusenleitner, 1998
Andrena pinkeunia Warncke, 1969
Andrena pyropygia Kriechbaumer, 1873
Andrena pyrozonata Friese, 1921
Andrena ramlehiana Pérez, 1903
Andrena rotundilabris Morawitz, 1877
Andrena rufitibialis Friese, 1899
Andrena rufomaculata Friese, 1921
Andrena rugothorace Warncke, 1965
Andrena rusticola Warncke, 1975
Andrena saettana Warncke, 1975
Andrena savignyi Spinola, 1838
Andrena schencki Morawitz, 1866
Andrena sedumella Scheuchl & Pisanty, 2018
Andrena selena Gusenleitner, 1994
Andrena semirubra Morawitz, 1876
Andrena serraticornis Warncke, 1965
Andrena sigiella Gusenleitner, 1998
Andrena similis Smith, 1849
Andrena simontornyella Noskiewicz, 1939
Andrena speciosa Friese, 1899
Andrena sphecodimorpha Hedicke, 1942
Andrena spolata Warncke, 1968
Andrena spreta Pérez, 1895
Andrena statusa Gusenleitner, 1998
Andrena stenofovea Scheuchl & Pisanty, 2018
Andrena tadauchii Gusenleitner, 1998
Andrena tadorna Warncke, 1974
Andrena thoracica (Fabricius, 1775)
Andrena tiaretta Warncke, 1974
Andrena tkalcui Gusenleitner & Schwarz, 2002
Andrena toelgiana Friese, 1921
Andrena torda Warncke, 1965
Andrena transitoria Morawitz, 1871  אנדרנה דבורית
Andrena trimmerana (Kirby, 1802)
Andrena tringa Warncke, 1973
Andrena troodica Warncke, 1975
Andrena truncatilabris Morawitz, 1877
Andrena tscheki Morawitz, 1872
Andrena ulula Warncke, 1969
Andrena ungeri Mavromoustakis, 1952
Andrena unicincta Friese, 1899
Andrena urfanella Scheuchl & Hazir, 2012
Andrena vachali Pérez, 1895
Andrena variabilis Smith, 1853
Andrena varicornis Pérez, 1895
Andrena venerabilis Alfken, 1935
Andrena ventricosa Dours, 1873
Andrena vetula Lepeletier, 1841
Andrena volka Warncke, 1969
Andrena wilhelmi Schuberth, 1995
Andrena wolfi Gusenleitner & Scheuchl, 2000
Andrena yelkouan Warncke, 1975
Camptopoeum abbasi (Warncke, 1985)
Camptopoeum negevense (Warncke, 1972)
Camptopoeum nigrotum (Warncke, 1987)
Camptopoeum ruber (Warncke, 1987)
Camptopoeum sacrum Alfken, 1935
Camptopoeum variegatum (Morawitz, 1876)
Clavipanurgus impressus (Warncke, 1972)
Clavipanurgus orientalicus (Warncke, 1972)
Clavipanurgus punctiventris (Morawitz, 1876)
Melitturga krausi Schwarz, 2003
Melitturga pictipes Morawitz, 1892
Melitturga spinosa Morawitz, 1892
Melitturga syriaca Friese, 1899
Panurginus turcomanicus Popov, 1936
Panurgus buteus Warncke, 1972
Panurgus dentatus Friese, 1901
Panurgus nigriscopus Pérez, 1895
Panurgus oblitus Warncke, 1972
Panurgus platymerus Pérez, 1895
Panurgus posticus Warncke, 1972
Panurgus pyropygus Friese, 1901

Halictidae
Ceylalictus punjabensis (Cameron, 1907)
Ceylalictus seistanicus (Blüthgen, 1934)
Ceylalictus variegatus (Olivier, 1789)
Dufourea bytinskii Ebmer, 1999
Dufourea chagrina (Warncke, 1979)
Dufourea goeleti Ebmer, 1999
Dufourea longicornis (Warncke, 1979)
Dufourea nodicornis (Warncke, 1979)
Dufourea rufiventris Friese, 1898
Dufourea similis Friese, 1898
Dufourea trigonellae Ebmer, 1999
Halictus aegypticola Strand, 1909
Halictus alfkenellus Strand, 1909
Halictus asperulus Pérez, 1895
Halictus berlandi Blüthgen, 1936 
Halictus brunnescens (Eversmann, 1852)
Halictus cephalicus Morawitz, 1873
Halictus cupidus Vachal, 1902
Halictus cypricus (Blüthgen, 1937) 
Halictus fatsensis Blüthgen, 1936
Halictus hermon Ebmer, 1975
Halictus libanensis Pérez, 1911 
Halictus lucidipennis Smith, 1853
Halictus maculatus Smith, 1848   הליקטית עקודה
Halictus patellatus Morawitz, 1874
Halictus pici Pérez, 1895
Halictus pollinosus (Sichel, 1860)
Halictus quadricinctus (Fabricius, 1776)   הליקטית ארבע-פסית
Halictus resurgens Nurse, 1903   הליקטית מזרחית
Halictus semiticus (Blüthgen, 1955) 
Halictus senilis (Eversmann, 1852)
Halictus sexcinctus Fabricius, 1775
Halictus smaragdulus Vachal, 1895
Halictus subauratus (Rossi, 1792)
Halictus subsenilis Blüthgen, 1955
Halictus tetrazonianellus Strand, 1909
Halictus tetrazonius Klug in Germar, 1817
Halictus tibialis Walker, 1871
Halictus tuberculatus (Blüthgen, 1924) 
Lasioglossum adaliae (Blüthgen, 1923)
Lasioglossum aegyptiellum (Strand, 1909)
Lasioglossum aglyphum (Pérez, 1895)
Lasioglossum alanum (Blüthgen, 1929)
Lasioglossum anellum (Vachal, 1905)
Lasioglossum angustipes Ebmer, 1972
Lasioglossum articulare (Pérez, 1895)
Lasioglossum bicallosum (Morawitz, 1874)
Lasioglossum bischoffi (Blüthgen, 1931)
Lasioglossum callizonium (Pérez, 1896)
Lasioglossum carneiventre (Dours, 1872)
Lasioglossum caspicum (Morawitz, 1874)
Lasioglossum clypeiferellum (Strand, 1909)
Lasioglossum costulatum (Kriechbaumer, 1873)
Lasioglossum crassepunctatum (Blüthgen, 1923)
Lasioglossum cristula (Pérez, 1896)
Lasioglossum damascenum (Pérez, 1910)
Lasioglossum debilior (Pérez, 1910)
Lasioglossum dichrous (Blüthgen, 1924)
Lasioglossum discum (Smith, 1853)
Lasioglossum dolichocephalum (Blüthgen, 1923)
Lasioglossum elbanum (Blüthgen, 1934)
Lasioglossum enslini Bytinski-Salz & Ebmer, 1974
Lasioglossum epipygiale (Blüthgen, 1924)
Lasioglossum fasciger (Strand, 1909)
Lasioglossum filipes Ebmer, 1972
Lasioglossum gibber (Vachal, 1892)
Lasioglossum glabriusculum (Morawitz, 1872)
Lasioglossum griseolum (Morawitz, 1872)
Lasioglossum hethiticum Ebmer, 1970
Lasioglossum imbecillum Ebmer, 1974
Lasioglossum israelense Ebmer, 1974
Lasioglossum ituraeum Ebmer, 1972
Lasioglossum laeve (Kirby, 1802)
Lasioglossum laevidorsum (Blüthgen, 1923)
Lasioglossum laticeps (Schenck, 1870)
Lasioglossum leptocephalum (Blüthgen, 1923)
Lasioglossum leucopymatum (Dalla Torre, 1896)
Lasioglossum leucozonium (Schrank, 1781)
Lasioglossum limbellum (Morawitz, 1876)
Lasioglossum lineare (Schenck, 1870)
Lasioglossum longirostre (Morawitz, 1876)
Lasioglossum lucidulum (Schenck, 1861)
Lasioglossum malachurum (Kirby, 1802)   הליקטית רחבת-פסים
Lasioglossum mandibulare (Morawitz, 1866)
Lasioglossum marginatum (Brullé, 1832)   הליקטית השוליים
Lasioglossum masculum (Pérez, 1895)
Lasioglossum mediterraneum (Blüthgen, 1926)
Lasioglossum mesosclerum (Pérez, 1903)
Lasioglossum minutissimum (Kirby, 1802)
Lasioglossum morio (Fabricius, 1793)
Lasioglossum mose Ebmer, 1974
Lasioglossum nabardicum (Blüthgen, 1931)
Lasioglossum nigripes (Lepeletier, 1841)
Lasioglossum obscuratum (Morawitz, 1876)
Lasioglossum ordubadense (Friese, 1916)
Lasioglossum pauxillum (Schenck, 1853)
Lasioglossum peregrinum (Blüthgen, 1923)
Lasioglossum picipes (Morawitz, 1876)
Lasioglossum politum (Schenck, 1853)
Lasioglossum pseudolittorale (Blüthgen, 1923)
Lasioglossum pseudosphecodimorphum (Blüthgen, 1923)
Lasioglossum punctatissimum (Schenck, 1853)
Lasioglossum puncticolle (Morawitz, 1872)
Lasioglossum pygmaeum (Schenck, 1853)
Lasioglossum soror (Saunders, 1901)
Lasioglossum subaenescens (Pérez, 1896)
Lasioglossum tadschicum (Blüthgen, 1929)
Lasioglossum transitorium (Schenck, 1868)
Lasioglossum truncaticolle  (Morawitz, 1877)
Lasioglossum vagans (Smith, 1857)
Lasioglossum villosulum (Kirby, 1802)
Lasioglossum xanthopus (Kirby, 1802)
Nomioides bluethgeni Pesenko, 1979
Nomioides deceptor Saunders, 1908
Nomioides facilis (Smith, 1853)
Nomioides klausi Pesenko, 1983
Nomioides minutissimus (Rossi, 1790)
Nomioides ornatus Pesenko, 1983
Nomioides rotundiceps Handlirsch, 1888
Nomioides similis Pesenko, 1983
Nomioides squamiger Saunders, 1908
Nomioides turanicus Morawitz, 1876
Pseudapis bispinosa (Brulle, 1832)
Pseudapis bytinski (Warncke, 1976)
Pseudapis diversipes (Latreille, 1806)
Pseudapis equestris (Gerstäcker, 1872)
Pseudapis inermis (Morawitz, 1895)
Pseudapis monstrosa (Costa, 1861)
Pseudapis nilotica (Smith, 1875)
Pseudapis patellata (Magretti, 1884)
Pseudapis valga (Gerstäcker, 1872)
Rophites algirus Pérez, 1895
Rophites hartmanni Friese, 1902
Rophites nigripes Friese 1902
Sphecodes albilabris (Fabricius, 1793)
Sphecodes alternatus Smith, 1853
Sphecodes crassus Thomson, 1870
Sphecodes gibbus (Linnaeus, 1785)
Sphecodes longulus Hagens, 1882
Sphecodes monilicornis (Kirby, 1802)
Sphecodes olivieri Lepeletier, 1825 
Sphecodes pinguiculus Pérez, 1903
Sphecodes puncticeps Thomson, 1870 
Sphecodes ruficrus (Erichson, 1835)
Sphecodes schenckii Hagens, 1882
Systropha hirsuta Spinola, 1839
Systropha planidens Giraud, 1861
Thrincohalictus prognathus (Pérez, 1912)

Melittidae
Dasypoda albipila Spinola, 1838
Dasypoda toroki Michez, 2004
Melitta aegyptiaca (Radoszkowski, 1891)
Melitta maura (Pérez, 1896)
Melitta schmiedeknechti Friese, 1898

Megachilidae

Afranthidium carduele (Morawitz, 1876)
Afranthidium lebanense (Mavromoustakis, 1955)
Allodioxys ammobius (Mavromoustakis, 1954)
Allodioxys schulthessi (Popov, 1936)
Anthidiellum breviusculum (Pérez, 1890)
Anthidiellum strigatum (Panzer, 1805)
Anthidium anguliventre Morawitz, 1888
Anthidium auritum Klug, 1832 
Anthidium diadema Latreille, 1809
Anthidium echinatum Klug, 1832
Anthidium eremicum Alfken, 1938
Anthidium loti Perris, 1852
Anthidium punctatum Latreille, 1809
Anthidium spiniventre Friese, 1899 
Anthidium syriacum Pérez, 1895
Anthidium taeniatum Latreille, 1809
Anthidium tesselatum Klug, 1832
Anthidium undulatum Dours, 1873
Chelostoma bytinskii (Mavromoustakis, 1948)
Chelostoma comosum Müller, 2012
Chelostoma diodon Schletterer, 1889
Chelostoma distinctum (Stöckhert, 1929)
Chelostoma forcipatum (Benoist, 1928)
Chelostoma hebraeum (Benoist, 1935)
Chelostoma isabellinum (Warncke, 1991)
Chelostoma maidli (Benoist, 1935)
Chelostoma mocsaryi Schletterer, 1889
Chelostoma palaestinum (Benoist, 1935)
Chelostoma rapunculi (Lepeletier, 1841)
Chelostoma schlettereri (Friese, 1899)
Coelioxys acanthura (Illiger 1806)
Coelioxys afra Lepeletier 1841
Coelioxys argentea Lepeletier, 1841
Coelioxys artemis Schwarz, 2001
Coelioxys brevis Eversmann, 1852
Coelioxys caudata Spinola, 1838
Coelioxys decipiens Spinola, 1838
Coelioxys elegantula Alfken, 1934
Coelioxys elongatula Alfken, 1938
Coelioxys elsei Schwarz, 2001
Coelioxys emarginatella Pasteels, 1982
Coelioxys haemorrhoa Foerster, 1853
Coelioxys mielbergi Morawitz, 1880
Coelioxys polycentris Forster, 1853
Coelioxys sogdiana Morawitz, 1875
Dioxys cincta (Jurine, 1807)
Dioxys pumila  Gerstaecker, 1869
Ensliniana bidentata (Friese, 1899)
Eoanthidium insulare (Morawitz, 1873)
Eoanthidium judaeense (Mavromoustakis, 1945)
Eudioxys quadrispinosa (Friese, 1899)
Haetosmia circumventa (Peters, 1974)
Haetosmia vechti (Peters, 1974)
Heriades clavicornis Morawitz, 1875
Heriades dalmaticus Maidl, 1922
Heriades hierosolomitus Benoist, 1935
Heriades punctulifer Schletterer, 1889
Heriades rubicolus Pérez, 1890
Heriades truncorum (Linnaeus, 1758)
Hofferia schmiedeknechti (Schletterer, 1889)
Hoplitis abnormis Zanden, 1992
Hoplitis acuticornis (Dufour & Perris, 1840)
Hoplitis africana (Warncke, 1990)
Hoplitis agis (Benoist, 1929)
Hoplitis anipuncta (Alfken, 1935)
Hoplitis annulata (Latreille, 1811)
Hoplitis antalyae Tkalců, 2000
Hoplitis aravensis (Zanden, 1992)
Hoplitis batyamae (Zanden, 1986)
Hoplitis bifoveolata (Alfken, 1935)
Hoplitis bisulca (Gerstacker, 1869)
Hoplitis brachypogon (Pérez, 1879)
Hoplitis bytinskii (Mavromoustakis, 1948)
Hoplitis campanularis (Morawitz, 1877)
Hoplitis christae (Warncke, 1991)
Hoplitis ciliaris (Pérez, 1902)
Hoplitis cypriaca (Mavromoustakis, 1938)
Hoplitis daniana (Mavromoustakis, 1949)
Hoplitis denticulata (Zanden, 1992)
Hoplitis desertorum Müller, 2014
Hoplitis eburnea (Warncke, 1991) 
Hoplitis enslini (Alfken, 1935)
Hoplitis erythrogastra (Mavromoustakis, 1954)
Hoplitis fertoni (Pérez, 1890)
Hoplitis flabellifera (Morice, 1901)
Hoplitis gerofita (Warncke, 1990)
Hoplitis hartliebi (Friese, 1899)
Hoplitis helouanensis (Friese, 1899)
Hoplitis hemisphaerica (Alfken, 1935)
Hoplitis hierichonica (Mavromoustakis, 1949)
Hoplitis hofferi Tkalcu, 1977
Hoplitis homalocera Zanden, 1991
Hoplitis improceros Zanden, 1998 
Hoplitis israelica (Warncke, 1991)
Hoplitis jordanica (Warncke, 1991)
Hoplitis leiocephala (Mavromoustakis, 1954)
Hoplitis libanensis (Morice, 1901) 
Hoplitis limassolica (Mavromoustakis, 1937)
Hoplitis lysholmi (Friese, 1899)
Hoplitis meyeri (Benoist, 1934)
Hoplitis minor (Morawitz, 1877)
Hoplitis mocsaryi (Friese, 1895)
Hoplitis moricei (Friese, 1899)
Hoplitis mucida (Dours, 1873)
Hoplitis negevensis (Warncke, 1991)
Hoplitis obtusa (Friese, 1899)
Hoplitis onychophora (Mavromoustakis, 1939)
Hoplitis pallicornis (Friese, 1895)
Hoplitis parana (Warncke, 1991)
Hoplitis paralias (Mavromoustakis, 1954)
Hoplitis perezi (Ferton, 1895)
Hoplitis praestans (Morawitz, 1894)
Hoplitis quinquespinosa (Friese, 1899)
Hoplitis rubricrus (Friese, 1899)
Hoplitis rufopicta (Morawitz, 1875)
Hoplitis semirubra (Friese, 1899)
Hoplitis segura (Warncke, 1991)
Hoplitis serainae Müller, 2012
Hoplitis sordida (Benoist, 1929)
Hoplitis subbutea (Warncke, 1991)
Hoplitis tridentata (Dufour and Perris, 1840)
Hoplitis tunica (Warncke, 1991)
Hoplitis unispina (Alfken, 1935)
Hoplitis verhoeffi (Mavromoustakis, 1954)
Hoplitis wadicola (Alfken, 1935)
Hoplitis wahrmani (Mavromoustakis, 1948) אוסמיית הפרג
Hoplitis yermasoyiae (Mavromoustakis, 1938)
Hoplitis testaceozonata (Alfken, 1935) 
Hoplitis tridentata (Dufour & Perris, 1840)
Hoplitis zonalis (Pérez, 1895)
Icteranthidium decoloratum (Alfken, 1932)
Icteranthidium ferrugineum (Fabricius, 1787)
Icteranthidium grohmanni (Spinola, 1838)
Lithurgus chrysurus (Fonscolombe, 1834)
Lithurgus tibialis Morawitz, 1875
Megachile albisecta (Klug, 1817)
Megachile albonotata Radoszkowski, 1886
Megachile apicalis Spinola, 1808
Megachile asiatica Morawitz, 1875
Megachile atrocastanea (Alfken, 1932)
Megachile centuncularis (Linnaeus, 1758)
Megachile cinnamomea Alfken, 1926
Megachile concinna Smith, 1879
Megachile dorsalis Pérez, 1879
Megachile esseniensis (Pasteels, 1979)
Megachile flabellipes Pérez, 1895
Megachile flavipes Spinola, 1838
Megachile giraudi Gerstaecker, 1869
Megachile hungarica Mocsáry, 1877
Megachile incerta Radoszkowski, 1876   בנאית הדורה
Megachile inexspectata Rebmann, 1968
Megachile insignis van der Zanden, 1996
Megachile judaea (Tkalců, 1999)
Megachile lagopoda (Linnaeus, 1761)
Megachile leucomalla Gerstaecker, 1869
Megachile levistriga Alfken, 1934
Megachile manicata Giraud, 1861
Megachile maxillosa Guérin-Méneville, 1845 בנאית הנגב
Megachile melanopyga Costa, 1863
Megachile monstrifica Morawitz, 1877
Megachile montenegrensis Dours, 1873
Megachile nigrita Radoszkowski, 1876
Megachile palaestina (Tkalců, 1988)
Megachile parietina (Geoffroy, 1785)   בנאית שחורה
Megachile picicornis Morawitz, 1853
Megachile pilicrus Morawitz, 1877
Megachile pyrenaica Lepeletier, 1841
Megachile rotundata (Fabricious, 1793)   גזרנית מעוגלת
Megachile sicula (Rossi, 1792)   בנאית אדמונית
Megachile tkalcui van der Zanden, 1996
Megachile walkeri Dalla Torre 1896
Metadioxys formosa (Morawitz 1875)
Ochreriades fasciata (Friese, 1899)
Osmia alfkenii Ducke, 1899
Osmia amathusica Mavromoustakis, 1937
Osmia andrenoides Spinola, 1808
Osmia apicata Smith, 1853
Osmia aquila Warncke, 1988
Osmia avedata Warncke, 1992
Osmia bidentata Morawitz, 1876 
Osmia caerulescens (Linnaeus, 1758)
Osmia cephalotes Morawitz, 1870
Osmia chrysolepta Haeseler, 2005
Osmia cinnabarina Pérez, 1895
Osmia clypearis Morawitz, 1871
Osmia cyanoxantha Pérez, 1879
Osmia difficilis Morawitz, 1875
Osmia dilaticornis Morawitz, 1875
Osmia dimidiata Morawitz, 1870
Osmia distinguenda (Tkalcu, 1974) 
Osmia dives Mocsary, 1877
Osmia erythrogastra Ferton, 1905
Osmia fasciata Latreille, 1811
Osmia ferruginea Latreille, 1811
Osmia gemmea Pérez, 1896
Osmia gracilicornis Pérez, 1895
Osmia gutturalis Warncke, 1988
Osmia hellados Zanden, 1984
Osmia hermona Warncke, 1992
Osmia hermonensis (Tkalcu, 1992)
Osmia jason Benoist, 1929
Osmia laticella van der Zanden, 1986
Osmia latreillei (Spinola, 1806)   אוסמיה מקרינה
Osmia lazulina Benoist, 1928
Osmia lhotelleriei Pérez, 1887
Osmia ligurica Morawitz, 1868
Osmia lobata Friese, 1899
Osmia melanogaster Spinola, 1808
Osmia milenae Tkalcu, 1992
Osmia mirhiji Mavromoustakis, 1957
Osmia moreensis Zanden, 1984
Osmia mustelina Gerstaecker, 1869
Osmia nana Morawitz, 1874
Osmia niveata (Fabricius, 1804)
Osmia notata (Fabricius, 1804)
Osmia pennata Warncke, 1988
Osmia pinguis Pérez, 1895
Osmia ramona Warncke, 1992
Osmia rhodoensis (Zanden, 1983)
Osmia rufa (Linnaeus, 1758)
Osmia rufohirta Latreille, 1811
Osmia rufotibialis Friese, 1920
Osmia saxatilis Warncke, 1988
Osmia saxicola Ducke, 1899
Osmia scutellaris Morawitz, 1868
Osmia signata Erichson, 1835
Osmia sogdiana Morawitz, 1875
Osmia spinigera Latreille, 1811
Osmia subcornuta Morawitz, 1875
Osmia submicans Morawitz, 1870
Osmia sybarita Smith, 1853
Osmia teunisseni van der Zanden, 1981
Osmia versicolor Latreille, 1811
Osmia viridana Morawitz, 1874
Paradioxys pannonica (Mocsáry, 1877)
Prodioxys carnea (Gribodo, 1894)
Protosmia humeralis (Pérez, 1895)
Protosmia judaica (Mavromoustakis, 1948)
Protosmia longiceps (Friese, 1899) 
Protosmia monstrosa (Pérez, 1895)
Protosmia paradoxa (Friese, 1899)
Protosmia pulex (Benoist, 1935) 
Protosmia tiflensis (Morawitz, 1876)
Pseudoanthidium bytinskii (Mavromoustakis, 1948)
Pseudoanthidium cribratum (Morawitz, 1875)
Pseudoanthidium melanurum (Klug 1832)
Pseudoanthidium ochrognathum (Alfken, 1932)
Pseudoanthidium rhombiferum (Friese, 1917)
Pseudoanthidium wahrmannicum (Mavromoustakis 1933)
Pseudoheriades moricei (Friese, 1897)
Rhodanthidium jerusalemicum (Mavromoustakis, 1938)
Rhodanthidium septemdentatum (Latreille, 1809)
Stelis aegyptiaca (Radoszkowsky 1876)
Stelis nasuta (Latreille 1809)
Stelis pentelica Mavromoustakis 1963
Stelis phaeoptera (Kirby 1802)
Stelis signata (Latreille 1809)
Stenoheriades asiaticus (Friese, 1921)
Stenoheriades eingeddicus Griswold, 1994
Stenoheriades levantica Müller, 2014
Trachusa pubescens Morawitz 1872
Wainia eremoplana (Mavromoustakis, 1949)

Apidae

Amegilla albigena (Lepeletier, 1841)
Amegilla lutulenta (Klug, 1845)
Amegilla mucorea (Klug, 1845)
Amegilla quadrifasciata (de Villers, 1789)
Ammobates armeniacus Morawitz 1876
Ammobates atrorufus (Warncke 1983)
Ammobates biastoides Friese 1895
Ammobates dubius Benoist, 1961
Ammobates latitarsis (Friese 1899)
Ammobates mavromoustakisi Popov, 1944
Ammobates minutissimus Mavromoustakis, 1959
Ammobates niveatus (Spinola, 1838)
Ammobates oraniensis (Lepeletier, 1841)
Ammobates robustus Friese, 1896
Ammobates syriacus Friese, 1899
Ancyla asiatica Friese 1922
Ancyla orientalica Warncke, 1979
Anthophora aegyptiaca (Dalla Torre and Friese, 1895)
Anthophora aestivalis (Panzer, 1801)
Anthophora agama Radoszkowski, 1869
Anthophora ambitiosa Alfken, 1935
Anthophora arabica Priesner, 1957
Anthophora atriceps Pérez, 1879
Anthophora biciliata Lepeletier, 1841
Anthophora blanda Pérez, 1895
Anthophora caelebs Gribodo, 1924
Anthophora canescens Brullé, 1832
Anthophora caroli Pérez, 1895
Anthophora cinerascens Lepeletier, 1841
Anthophora crassipes Lepeletier 1841
Anthophora crinipes Smith, 1854
Anthophora deserticola Morawitz 1873
Anthophora dispar Lepeletier, 1841
Anthophora disparilis Friese 1922
Anthophora dufourii Lepeletier 1841
Anthophora erschowi Fedtschenko 1875
Anthophora erubescens Morawitz 1880
Anthophora extricata Priesner, 1957
Anthophora flabellata Priesner, 1957
Anthophora fulvitarsis Brulle, 1832   מדרונית צהובת-רגל
Anthophora heliopolitensis Pérez 1910
Anthophora hispanica (Fabricius 1787)
Anthophora libyphaenica Gribodo 1893
Anthophora muscaria Fedtschenko 1875
Anthophora nigriceps Morawitz, 1886
Anthophora orientalis Morawitz 1878
Anthophora plumipes (Pallas, 1772)   מדרונית ארוכת-פיסה
Anthophora ponomarevae Brooks 1988
Anthophora priesneri Alfken 1932
Anthophora pubescens Fabricius 1871
Anthophora richaensis Alfken 1938
Anthophora robusta (Klug 1845)
Anthophora rogenhoferi Morawitz 1872
Anthophora romandii Lepeletier 1841
Anthophora rubricrus Dours, 1873
Anthophora rutilans Dours 1869
Anthophora scopipes Spinola, 1838
Anthophora semirufa (Friese 1898)
Anthophora senescens Lepeletier 1841
Anthophora sergia (Nurse, 1904)
Anthophora spinacoxa Brooks, 1988
Anthophora tarsalis Priesner 1957
Anthophora vernalis Morawitz 1878
Anthophora vidua (Klug, 1845)
Anthophora wegelini Friese 1914
Apis mellifera syriaca Skorikov, 1829 דבורה סורית 
Bombus argillaceus (Scopoli, 1763)   בומבוס ארך-ראש
Bombus niveatus (Kriechbaumer, 1870)   בומבוס החרמון
Bombus terrestris (Linnaeus, 1758)   בומבוס האדמה
Ceratina acuta Friese, 1896
Ceratina bifida Friese, 1900
Ceratina bispinosa Handlirsch, 1889
Ceratina chalcites Germar, 1839   צרטינה ענקית
Ceratina cucurbitina (Rossi, 1792)
Ceratina dallatorreana Friese, 1896
Ceratina dentiventris Gerstäcker, 1869
Ceratina loewi Gerstacker, 1869
Ceratina mandibularis Friese, 1896
Ceratina moricei Friese, 1899
Ceratina nigroaenea Gerstacker, 1869
Ceratina nigrolabiata Friese, 1896
Ceratina parvula Smith, 1854   צרטינה ננסית
Ceratina schwarzi Kocourek, 1998
Ceratina tarsata Morawitz, 1871
Ceratina tibialis Morawitz, 1895
Ceratina zandeni Terzo, 1998
Chiasmognathus aegyptiacus (Warncke 1983)
Chiasmognathus orientanus (Warncke, 1983)
Cubitalia baal Engel, 2006
Cubitalia boyadjiani (Vachal, 1907)
Epeolus bischoffi (Mavromoustakis, 1954)
Epeolus flavociliatus Friese, 1899
Eucera aeolopus Pérez, 1908
Eucera aequata Vachal, 1907
Eucera alfkeni Risch, 2003
Eucera alternans (Brullé, 1832)
Eucera bidentata Pérez, 1887
Eucera biscrensis (Alfken, 1933)
Eucera caerulescens Friese, 1899
Eucera cinnamomea Alfken, 1935
Eucera clypeata Erichson, 1835
Eucera commixta Dalla Torre & Friese, 1895
Eucera cuniculina Klug, 1845
Eucera curvitarsis Mocsary, 1879
Eucera dalmatica Lepeletier, 1841
Eucera decipiens Alfken, 1935
Eucera ebmeri Risch, 1999
Eucera friesei Risch, 2003
Eucera furfurea Vachal, 1907
Eucera gaullei Vachal, 1907
Eucera graeca Radoszkowski, 1876
Eucera helvola Klug, 1845
Eucera hermoni Risch, 2003
Eucera hungarica Friese, 1896
Eucera kilikiae Risch, 1999
Eucera kullenbergi Tkalců, 1978
Eucera laxiscopa Alfken, 1935
Eucera maxima Tkalců, 1987
Eucera mediterranea Friese, 1896
Eucera microsoma Cockerell, 1922
Eucera minulla Risch, 2003
Eucera nigrifacies Lepeletier, 1841
Eucera nigrilabris Lepeletier, 1841
Eucera nigrita Friese, 1896
Eucera palaestinae Friese, 1922 מחושית ישראלית
Eucera paraclypeata Sitdikov, 1988
Eucera parnassia Pérez, 1902
Eucera penicillata Risch, 1997
Eucera pici Vachal, 1907
Eucera plumigera Kohl, 1905
Eucera pseudeucnemidea Risch, 1997
Eucera speculifer Pérez, 1911
Eucera spectabilis (Morawitz, 1875)
Eucera spinipes Risch, 2003
Eucera squamosa Lepeletier, 1841
Eucera sulamita Vachal, 1907
Eucera syriaca Dalla Torre, 1896
Eucera tricincta Erichson, 1835
Eucera troglodytes Risch, 2003
Eucera velutina (Morawitz, 1873)
Eucera vulpes Brullé, 1832
Exoneuridia libanensis (Friese 1899)
Habropoda tarsata (Spinola, 1838)
Melecta aegyptiaca Radoszkowski, 1876
Melecta albifrons (Forster, 1771)
Melecta angustilabris (Lieftinck, 1980)
Melecta diligens Lieftinck, 1983
Melecta festiva Lieftinck, 1980
Melecta fulgida Lieftinck, 1980
Melecta grandis Lepeletier, 1841
Melecta honesta Lieftinck, 1980
Melecta italica Radoszkowski, 1876
Melecta leucorhyncha Gribodo, 1893
Melecta sinaitica (Alfken, 1937)
Melecta tuberculata Lieftinck, 1980
Nomada agrestis Fabricius, 1787
Nomada basalis Herrich-Schäffer, 1839
Nomada braunsiana Schmiedeknecht, 1882
Nomada caspia Morawitz, 1895
Nomada cherkesiana Mavromoustakis, 1955
Nomada cleopatra Schwarz, 1989
Nomada confinis Schmiedeknecht, 1882
Nomada coxalis Morawitz 1877
Nomada curvispinosa Schwarz, 1981
Nomada eos Schmiedeknecht, 1882
Nomada femoralis Morawitz, 1869
Nomada fenestrata Lepeletier 1841
Nomada flavinervis Brullé, 1832
Nomada flavoguttata (Kirby, 1802)
Nomada fucata Panzer, 1798
Nomada gracilicornis Morawitz 1895
Nomada guichardi Schwarz, 1981
Nomada guttulata Schenck, 1861
Nomada hera Schwarz, 1965
Nomada insignipes Schmiedeknecht, 1882
Nomada integra Brullé 1832
Nomada kervilleana Pérez, 1913
Nomada kohli Schmiedeknecht, 1882
Nomada kusdasi Schwarz, 1981
Nomada lateritia Mocsáry, 1883
Nomada lucidula Schwarz 1967
Nomada mutica Morawitz, 1872
Nomada mavromoustakisi Schwarz and Standfuss, 2007
Nomada nausicaa Schmiedeknecht, 1882
Nomada nobilis Herrich-Schäffer, 1839
Nomada oculata Friese, 1921
Nomada ovaliceps Schwarz, 1981
Nomada pallispinosa Schwarz, 1967
Nomada propinqua Schmiedeknecht, 1882
Nomada rubiginosa Pérez, 1884
Nomada rubricollis Schwarz, 1967
Nomada rufohirta Morawitz, 1895
Nomada sexfasciata Panzer, 1799
Nomada stoeckherti Pittioni, 1951
Nomada thersites Schmiedeknecht 1882
Nomada tridentirostris Dours, 1873
Parammobatodes maroccanus (Warncke, 1983)
Parammobatodes nuristanus (Warncke, 1983)
Parammobatodes rozeni Schwarz, 2003
Pasites maculatus Jurine, 1807
Schmiedeknechtia verhoeffi Mavromoustakis 1959
Tarsalia ancyliformis Popov, 1935
Tarsalia mimetes (Cockerell, 1933)
Tetralonia malvae (Rossi, 1790)
Thyreus elegans (Morawitz, 1878)
Thyreus histrionicus (Illiger, 1806)
Thyreus hyalinatus (Vachal, 1903)
Thyreus ramosellus (Cockerell, 1919)
Thyreus ramosus  (Lepeletier, 1841)
Thyreus tricuspis  (Pérez, 1883)
Thyreus truncatus  (Pérez, 1883)
Xylocopa iris (Christ, 1791)   דבורת-עץ עדינה
Xylocopa olivieri Lepeletier, 1841   צלפונית מפוספסת
Xylocopa pubescens Spinola, 1838   דבורת-עץ צהובה
Xylocopa rufa Friese, 1901   צלפונית חומה
Xylocopa sulcatipes Maa, 1970   דבורת-עץ שחורה
Xylocopa ustulata Smith, 1854
Xylocopa valga Gerstacker, 1872   דבורת-עץ צפונית
Xylocopa varentzowi Morawitz, 1895
Xylocopa violacea (Linnaeus, 1758)   דבורת-עץ סגולה

Nonindigenous species

Apidae
Apis florea Fabricius, 1787 דבורת-הדבש הננסית
Apis mellifera ligustica Spinola, 1806 דבורת הדבש האיטלקית

References

Scientific publications
Bytinski-Salz, H. and Ebmer, A. W. (1974). The Halictidae of Israel (Hymenoptera, Apoidea). II. Genus Lasioglossum, Israel Journal of Entomology, 9, 175-215.
Ebmer, A. W. (1999). Die westpaläarktischen Arten der Gattung Dufourea Lepeletier 1841 (Insecta: Hymenoptera: Apoidea: Halictidae: Rophitinae): Vierter Nachtrag. Linzer Biol. Beitr., 31, 183-228.
Guershon, M. and Ionescu-Hirsch, A. (2012). A review of the Xylocopa species (Hymenoptera: Apidae) of Israel. Israel Journal of Entomology 41–42: 145–163. 
Maa, T. C. (1970). A revision of the subgenus Ctenoxylocopa (Hymenoptera: Anthophoridae). Pacific Insects 12(4): 723-752 
Michez, D. and Eardley, C. (2007). Monographic revision of the bee genus Melitta Kirby 1802 (Hymenoptera: Apoidea: Melittidae). Ann. Soc. Entomol. Fr., 43, 379-440. 
Michez, D., Terzo, M. and Rasmont, P. (2004). Revision des espèces ouest-paléarctiques du genre Dasypoda Latreille 1802 (Hymenoptera, Apoidea, Melittidae). Linzer Biol. Beitr., 36, 847-900.
Packer L. 2000. The biology of Thrincohalictus prognathus (Pérez) (Hymenoptera: Halictidae: Halictini). Journal of Hymenoptera Research 9: 53-61.
Risch, S. (2001). Die Arten des Genus Eucera Scopoli 1770 (Hymenoptera, Apidae) Untergattung Pareucera Tkalcü 1979. Entomofauna, 22, 365-376.
Risch, S. (2003). Die Arten der Gattung Eucera Scopoli 1770 (Hymenoptera, Apidae): Die Untergattungen Stilbeucera Tkalcu 1979, Ätopeucera Tkalcu 1984 und Hemieucera Sitdikov & Pesenko 1988. Linzer Biol. Beitr., 35, 1241-1292.
Terzo, M. (1998). Annotated list of the species of the genus Ceratina (Latreille) occurring in the Near East, with descriptions of new species (Hymenoptera: Apoidea: Xylocopinae). Linzer Biol. Beitr., 30, 719-743.
Warncke, K. (1969). A contribution to the knowledge of the genus Andrena (Apoidea) in Israel. Israel Journal of Entomology, 4, 377-408.
Warncke, K. (1984). A contribution to the knowledge of the genus Prosopis (Hymenoptera: Apidae: Colletinae) in Israel. Israel Journal of Entomology, 18, 53-61.
Warncke, K. (1992). Die Bienengattung Systropha Ill. neu für Israel und Zentralasien. Linzer Biol. Beitr., 24, 741-746.

Books
Banaszak, J. & Romasenko, L. (2001). Megachilid bees of Europe (Hymenoptera, Apoidea, Megachilidae). 2nd ed. (corrected and supplemented). Bydgoszcz University, Bydgoszcz, 239 pp.
Grace, A. (2010). Introductory Biogeography to Bees of the Eastern Mediterranean and Near East.
Kugler, J. (1989). Insects. In A. Alon [ed.], Plants and Animals of the Land of Israel: An Illustrated Encyclopedia, Vol. 3. Israel: Ministry of Defence and the SPNI. (In Hebrew)

Internet sites
Atlas Hymenoptera 
Kuhlmann, M. et al., Checklist of the Western Palaearctic Bees
Discover Life
Müller, A., Palaearctic Osmiine Bees, ETH Zürich

Entomological collections
The National Entomological Collections at Tel Aviv University

Israel
Bees

Bees